Köthen was a district (Kreis) in the middle of Saxony-Anhalt, Germany. Neighboring districts were (from north clockwise) Anhalt-Zerbst, Schönebeck, Anhalt-Zerbst, the district-free city Dessau, Bitterfeld, Saalkreis and Bernburg.

History 

In 1603 the principality of Anhalt-Köthen was created, when the principality of Anhalt was split in five parts. In 1665 it merged with Anhalt-Plötzkau, and in 1807 it became a duchy. 1847 it was divided between Anhalt-Dessau and Anhalt-Bernburg, and in 1853 it was merged with Anhalt-Dessau to form the Duchy of Anhalt-Dessau-Köthen.

When in 1863 the various parts of Anhalt were reunited, the district was created. At first the district Dessau-Köthen did cover the area surrounding the two district-free cities Dessau and Köthen. In 1950 the city of Köthen was added to the district, and it was renamed after its capital.  As result of the district reform of 2007, the area was merged into the new district of Anhalt-Bitterfeld with the city of Köthen as its capital.

Geography 
The district is located in the Magdeburger Börde, with soft hills from the moraines from the last ice age. The river Elbe forms part of the northern boundary of the district.

Coat of arms

Towns and municipalities

See also 
 Principality of Anhalt-Köthen

External links 
  (German)

History of Anhalt
1863 establishments in Europe
2007 disestablishments in Germany